Jay M. Bernstein is an American philosopher, and University Distinguished Professor at The New School. He received a BA from Trinity College in 1970 and graduated from the University of Edinburgh with a PhD in 1975.

Bernstein is an expert in Continental philosophy and a leading interpreter of the philosophy of Adorno. According to Espen Hammer, Bernstein situates Adorno "in the middle of contemporary philosophical debate in ethics," by arguing that "genuine ethical responsiveness must be sought for in the repressed margins of society".

Bernstein has published two books on art, The Fate of Art and Against Voluptuous Bodies: Late Modernism and the Meaning of Painting. In an interview with the Brooklyn Rail following these publications, Bernstein stated that "the modern rationality that creates modern science, that creates the capitalist economy, that creates bureaucratic rationality, needs to get rid of sensuous materiality, concreteness, and the experience of those things."

Jay Bernstein was a 2013 Berlin Prize Fellow at the American Academy in Berlin.

He is a co-editor of the journal Critical Horizons.

Bernstein is known for his lectures on Kant and Hegel, some of which have been recorded as part of the  project, The Bernstein Tapes.

Books
 The Philosophy of the Novel: Lukács, Marxism and the Dialectics of Form. The Harvester Press, 1984.
 Recovering Ethical Life: Jurgen Habermas and the future of Critical Theory. Routledge, 1995.
 The Fate of Art: Aesthetic Alienation from Kant to Derrida and Adorno. Pennsylvania State University Press, 1992.
 Adorno: Disenchantment and Ethics. Cambridge University Press, 2001.
 Against Voluptuous Bodies: Late Modernism and the Meaning of Painting. Stanford University Press, 2006.
 Torture and Dignity: An Essay on Moral Injury. University of Chicago Press, 2015.

References

The New School faculty
Alumni of the University of Edinburgh
Living people
21st-century American philosophers
Philosophers from New York (state)
Year of birth missing (living people)
Continental philosophers